The Welsh Rugby Union League 2 West (also called the SWALEC League 2 West for sponsorship reasons) is a rugby union league in Wales.

Competition format and sponsorship

Competition
There are 12 clubs in the WRU League 2 West. During the course of a season (which lasts from September to May) each club plays the others twice, once at their home ground and once at that of their opponents for a total of 22 games for each club, with a total of 132 games in each season. Teams receive four points for a win and two point for a draw, an additional bonus point is awarded to either team if they score four tries or more in a single match. No points are awarded for a loss though the losing team can gain a bonus point for finishing the match within seven points of the winning team. Teams are ranked by total points, then the number of tries scored and then points difference. At the end of each season, the club with the most points is crowned as champion. If points are equal the tries scored then points difference determines the winner. The team who is declared champion at the end of the season is eligible for promotion to the WRU League 1 West. The two lowest placed teams are relegated into the WRU Division Three West or WRU Division Three South West depending on geographical location.

Sponsorship 
In 2008 the Welsh Rugby Union announced a new sponsorship deal for the club rugby leagues with SWALEC valued at £1 million (GBP). The initial three year sponsorship was extended at the end of the 2010/11 season, making SWALEC the league sponsors until 2015. The leagues sponsored are the WRU Divisions one through to seven.

 (2002-2005) Lloyds TSB
 (2005-2008) Asda
 (2008-2015) SWALEC

2011/12 Season

League teams
 Aberavon Quins RFC
 Aberystwyth RFC
 Builth Wells RFC
 Crymych RFC
 Cwmllynfell RFC
 Felinfoel RFC
 Glynneath RFC
 Kenfig Hill RFC
 Kidwelly RFC
 Loughor RFC
 Maesteg RFC
 Skewen RFC

2011/2012 table

2010/2011 Season

League teams
 Aberavon Quins RFC
 Aberystwyth RFC
 Ammanford RFC
 BP Llandarcy RFC
 Builth Wells
 Cwmllynfell RFC
 Kidwelly RFC
 Loughor RFC
 Newcastle Emlyn RFC
 Pontyberem RFC
 Skewen RFC
 Tondu RFC

2010/2011 table

2009/2010 Season

League teams
 Aberavon Quins RFC
 Aberystwyth RFC
 Ammanford RFC
 BP Llandarcy RFC
 Dunvant RFC
 Kidwelly RFC
 Loughor RFC
 Maesteg RFC
 Mumbles RFC
 Pencoed RFC
 Pontyberem RFC
 Waunarlwydd RFC

2009/2010 table

2008/2009 Season

League teams
 Ammanford RFC
 BP Llandarcy RFC
 Bridgend Athletic RFC
 Builth Wells RFC
 Cwmavon RFC
 Gorseinon RFC
 Kidwelly RFC
 Loughor RFC
 Mumbles RFC
 Penclawdd RFC
 Pencoed RFC
 Waunarlwydd RFC

2008/2009 table

2007/2008 Season 
Felinfoel were named champions after a perfect season and were promoted to Division One West along with second placed Carmarthen Athletic. Tumble, Nantymoel and Pontyberem were relegated after finishing in the last three places.

League teams
 Carmarthen Athletic RFC
 Cwmavon RFC
 Felinfoel RFC
 Gorseinon RFC
 Kidwelly RFC
 Loughor RFC
 Mumbles RFC
 Nantymoel RFC
 Penclawdd RFC
 Pencoed RFC
 Pontyberem RFC
 Tumble RFC

2007/2008 table

2006/2007 Season 

See 2006–07 in Welsh rugby union

Winners

References

4